Zaher Kandi (also Romanized as Z̧āher Kandī) is a village in Chaharduli Rural District of Keshavarz District of Shahin Dezh County, West Azerbaijan province, Iran. At the 2006 National Census, its population was 703 in 138 households. The following census in 2011 counted 661 people in 182 households. The latest census in 2016 showed a population of 664 people in 192 households; it was the largest village in its rural district.

References 

Shahin Dezh County

Populated places in West Azerbaijan Province

Populated places in Shahin Dezh County